Baldwin County is a county located in the central portion of the U.S. state of Georgia. As of the 2020 census, its population was 43,799. The county seat is Milledgeville, which was developed along the Oconee River.

Baldwin County is part of the Milledgeville micropolitan statistical area.

History

For centuries, the land was occupied by the Creek Nation, and for thousands of years before them, varying cultures of indigenous peoples.

Part of the land ceded by the Creek people in the Treaty of Fort Wilkinson in 1802 was used to create Baldwin County on May 11, 1803, by the Georgia General Assembly, the state's legislative body.

The land west of the Oconee River was organized as Baldwin and Wilkinson Counties. The Treaty of Washington with the Creek in 1805 extended the state's western boundary to the Ocmulgee River. A legislative act on June 26, 1806, added some of this additional land to both counties.

The state legislature subsequently passed an act on December 10, 1807, that created four new counties from Baldwin County's 1806 borders. It expanded Baldwin to the east with land from Hancock and Washington Counties. The new counties were Morgan, Jones, Putnam, and present-day Jasper (originally named Randolph County at the time of the act).

The county is named for Abraham Baldwin, a signer of the United States Constitution, U.S. congressman representing Georgia, and the founder of the University of Georgia. White settlers moved into the area and developed large cotton plantations, made possible by the labor of slaves. Since the invention of the cotton gin, short-staple cotton could be profitably processed, and it was well-suited to the uplands of Georgia. What became known as the Black Belt of Georgia, an arc of fertile soil, was one of the destinations for slaves being sold from the Upper South, as well as from the Low Country.

The county seat of Milledgeville is the former state capital of Georgia (1804–1868). Other than Washington, DC, it is the only planned capital city in the United States.
Indianapolis, the capital of Indiana is also a planned city.

Because of its central location within the state and its abundant supply of water from the Oconee River, Milledgeville grew rapidly into a bustling frontier town. On November 2, 1807, the state legislature held its first session in the newly completed statehouse in Milledgeville. Georgia's first state penitentiary was also built within the historic city limits of Milledgeville in 1817. This site is now used as the main campus of Georgia College and State University. In 1837, the General Assembly provided for the establishment of the state's first mental asylum, today known as Central State Hospital.

When the state of Georgia seceded from the Union in January 1861, during a legislative session held in Milledgeville, Baldwin County became a target for Union forces. When Union general William T. Sherman made his devastating March to the Sea through Georgia, his troops occupied the capital city in November 1864. Sherman and his Union armies burned the state penitentiary, vandalized the city, and held a mock session of the legislature in the statehouse to repeal the state's ordinance of secession.

In 1868, after the Civil War (1861–65), Georgia's capital was moved from Milledgeville to its present location in Atlanta. Today, Milledgeville is home to two institutions of higher education: Georgia College and State University and Georgia Military College. Founded in 1889 as the Georgia Normal and Industrial College for Women, Georgia College and State University has since grown to become the state's premier public liberal-arts university. Georgia Military College, founded in 1879, now occupies the Old Capitol Building.

In addition to the Old Capitol and Governor's Mansion, visitors to Baldwin County can explore Andalusia, the family farm of writer Flannery O'Connor; Milledgeville's historic district; and the Lockerly Arboretum, a botanical garden and nature education center that hosts the Lockerly Heritage Festival each September.

Notable people
 Carl Vinson, who served for 50 years in the U.S. Congress, was born in Baldwin County.
 Oliver Hardy, comedian and film director, began his career in the Milledgeville Opera House.
 Flannery O'Connor, novelist and short-story writer, lived in Milledgeville. She is buried in her family plot in the city's historic Memory Hill Cemetery.

Geography

The county is located along the fall line of the Eastern United States. The city of Milledgeville, which is located along the Oconee River, is an important city in the region. Because of its location, the northern part of the county tends to be more hilly due to its location in the Piedmont than the southern part of the county, which is in the far northern part of the Atlantic coastal plain.

Most of Baldwin County, south of Lake Sinclair, is located in the Lower Oconee River sub-basin of the Altamaha River basin.  The northern portion of the county is located in the Upper Oconee River sub-basin of the same Altamaha River basin.

Adjacent counties
 Putnam County, Georgia - north
 Hancock County, Georgia - northeast
 Washington County, Georgia - east
 Wilkinson County, Georgia - south
 Jones County, Georgia - west

Transportation

Major highways

  U.S. Route 441
 U.S. Route 441 Business
  State Route 22
  State Route 24
  State Route 29
  State Route 49
  State Route 112
  State Route 212
  State Route 243
  State Route 540 (Fall Line Freeway)

Hiking and cycling

 Oconee River Greenway

Demographics

2000 census
As of the census of 2010,  46,337 people, 14,758 households, and 9,843 families were living in the county. The 17,173 housing units had an average density of 66 per square mile (26/km2). The racial makeup of the county was 54.17% White, 43.38% African American, 0.21% Native American, 1.01% Asian,  0.49% from other races, and 0.74% from two or more races. About 1.36% of the population were Hispanics or Latinos of any race.

Of the 14,758 households, 31.0% had children under 18 living with them, 43.9% were married couples living together, 18.2% had a female householder with no husband present, and 33.3% were nont families. About 25.6% of all households were made up of individuals, and 7.8% had someone living alone who was 65 or older.  The average household size was 2.50, and the average family size was 3.02.

In the county, the age distribution was 21.7% under 18, 14.5% from 18 to 24, 31.2% from 25 to 44, 21.9% from 45 to 64, and 10.60 who were 65 or older.  The median age was 34 years. For every 100 females, there were 117.30 males.  For every 100 females 18 and over, there were 119.70 males.

The median income for a household in the county was $35,159, and for a family was $42,736. Males had a median income of $31,227 versus $22,718 for females. The per capita income for the county was $16,271.  About 11.80% of families and 16.80% of the population were below the poverty line, including 22.80% of those under age 18 and 13.00% of those age 65 or over.

2010 census
As of the 2010 United States Census,  45,720 people, 16,788 households, and 10,373 families resided in the county. The racial makeup of the county was 54.9% White, 41.5% African American, 1.3% Asian, 0.2% American Indian, 0.8% from other races, and 1.2% from two or more races. Those of Hispanic or Latino origin made up 2.0% of the population. In terms of ancestry, 41.5% were African, 24.0% were American, 7.9% were English, and 6.8% were Irish.

Of the 16,788 households, 30.5% had children under the age of 18 living with them, 38.0% were married couples living together, 19.2% had a female householder with no husband present, 38.2% were not families, and 26.9% of all households were made up of individuals. The average household size was 2.45, and the average family size was 2.97. The median age was 34.1 years.

The median income for a household in the county was $37,237 and for a family was $47,714. Males had a median income of $36,158 versus $26,576 for females. The per capita income for the county was $17,488. About 16.8% of families and 25.2% of the population were below the poverty line, including 31.6% of those under age 18 and 10.8% of those age 65 or over.

2020 census

As of the 2020 United States census, 43,799 people, 16,191 households, and 9,568 families were residing in the county.

Government
Members of the Baldwin County Board of Commissioners are responsible for administering the government to residents. Five members are on the board, elected from single-member districts. They serve four-year terms, and are up for election in a staggered fashion. The members of the board elect the chair from among themselves.

Politics
Baldwin County has been a Democratic-leaning swing county in recent presidential elections, with no candidate receiving more than 52.9% of the vote in any presidential election from 1992 onward. The county was the only one in Georgia that failed to give a majority to either major-party candidate in the 2018 gubernatorial election, with Democrat Stacey Abrams only winning the county by 58 votes over Republican Brian Kemp. Possibly due to rural shifts rightward nationwide, Baldwin County has become far more competitive, as Joe Biden defeated Donald Trump in the 2020 presidential race by a margin around 1%.

Education

Communities

City
 Milledgeville (county seat)

Census-designated place
 Hardwick

Unincorporated community
 Scottsboro

See also

 National Register of Historic Places listings in Baldwin County, Georgia
List of counties in Georgia

References

Further reading
 Anna Maria Green Cook, The History of Baldwin County, Georgia. (1925) Spartanburg, SC: Reprint Co., 1978.

External links
 Baldwin County website
 Georgia Encyclopedia Baldwin County entry

 
1803 establishments in Georgia (U.S. state)
Populated places established in 1803
Georgia (U.S. state) counties
Milledgeville micropolitan area, Georgia